Ronald Kearns (born in New Zealand) is a former association football player who represented New Zealand at international level.

Kearns played domestic football in New Zealand for Seatoun, winning back to back Chatham Cups in 1957 and 1958, before moving to Australia to play with Sydney Hakoah in 1960.

Kearns made his full New Zealand debut in a 2–2 draw with Australia on 23 August 1958 and ended his international playing career with four official A-international caps to his credit, his final appearance in a 2–1 win over New Caledonia on 14 September 1958.

References

New Zealand association footballers
New Zealand international footballers
Year of birth missing (living people)
Living people
Association football defenders